Chambers brothers may refer to:

 Chambers brothers (pastoralists), James and John Chambers, early settlers in South Australia
 Chambers Brothers (gang), B.J., Larry, Willie and Otis Chambers, a criminal organization in Detroit during the 1980s
 The Chambers Brothers, an American psychedelic soul band

See also
Chambers (surname)